Luigi Cangiullo (1897 – 1 September 1930) was an Italian diver. He competed at the 1924 Summer Olympics and the 1928 Summer Olympics.

References

External links
 

1897 births
1930 deaths
Italian male divers
Olympic divers of Italy
Divers at the 1924 Summer Olympics
Divers at the 1928 Summer Olympics
Divers from Naples